Nawagarh is a town in Bemetera district (Earlier in Durg) of the Indian state of Chattishgarh.

Presence of historical temples, statue of goddess found under deep soil and pond and a bawadi (Well like structure) said to have been built by king are proofs of its divinity and archeological history.

References

External links

Cities and towns in Bemetara district